John Corvinus (Hungarian: Corvin János, Croatian: Ivaniš Korvin, Romanian: Ioan Corvin; 2 April 1473 – 12 October 1504) was the illegitimate son of Matthias Corvinus, King of Hungary, and his mistress, Barbara Edelpöck.

Biography

Early life

Born in Buda, he took his name from the raven (Latin: corvus) in his father's escutcheon. Matthias originally intended him for the Church, but on losing all hope of offspring from his queen, Beatrice of Naples, determined, towards the end of his life, to make the youth his successor on the throne. He loaded him with honours and riches until he was by far the wealthiest magnate in the land. He publicly declared him his successor, created him a prince with vast apanages in Silesia (Duchy of Głogów) made the commandants of all the fortresses in the kingdom take an oath of allegiance to him, and tried to arrange a marriage for him with Bianca Maria Sforza of Milan, a project which was frustrated by the intrigues of Queen Beatrice.

Matthias also intended to make the recognition of John as Prince Royal of Hungary by Holy Roman Emperor Frederick III, in counterpart of relinquishing all or part of the conquered hereditary domains of the House of Habsburg; but his sudden death left the matter still pending, and the young prince suddenly found himself alone in the midst of enemies.

After Matthias's death
The inexperienced and irresolute youth speedily became the victim of the most shameful chicanery. He was first induced formally to resign his claims to the throne, on the understanding that he was to be compensated with the crown of Bosnia. He was then persuaded to retire southwards with the royal treasures which Matthias had confided to him, whereupon an army immediately started in pursuit, scattered his forces, and robbed him of everything.

Meanwhile, the diet had elected Vladislaus Jagiellon of Bohemia King (15 July 1490), to whom John hastened to do homage, in order to save something from the wreck of his fortunes. He was also recognized as duke of Slavonia and Opava, but compelled to relinquish both titles five years later. On the invasion of Hungary by Maximilian, he showed his loyalty to the crown by relinquishing into the hands of Vladislaus the three important fortresses in Pressburg (present day Bratislava in Slovakia), Komárom and Tata, which had been entrusted to him by his father. But now, encouraged by his complacency, the chief dignitaries, headed by the Palatine Stephen Zápolya (? – 1499), laid claim to nearly all his remaining estates and involved him in a whole series of costly processes. This they could do with perfect impunity, as they had poisoned the mind of the indolent and suspicious king against their victim.

Marriage and issue
In 1496 Corvinus married Beatrice Frangepán, the daughter of Bernard Frangepán and Lujza Marzano d'Aragona (b.1455). His prospects now improved, and in 1498 he was created perpetual Ban of Croatia and Slavonia. From 1499 to 1502 he successfully defended the unconquered parts of Bosnia against the Turks, and in the following year aspired to the dignity of Palatine, but was defeated by a combination of Queen Beatrice and his other enemies. He died at Krapina on 12 October 1504, leaving one son, Christopher, who died on 17 March 1505 and a daughter, Elisabeth, who died in 1508.

Genetics
Recently, his and Christopher’s ossuary remains have been analyzed using DNA sequencing and the results will be published once the project is completed, a collaboration between Hungarian and Croatian scientists.
According to the results:
 just Johannes Corvinus was left in the Admixture analysis. The Corvinus' genome contain the following Admixture component 50% Neolithic Anatolian, 31% Ancient North Eurasian, 8% Iranian Neolithic, 5% Western Hunter gatherer, 3% Early Bronze Age and 2 Han
North Eurasian is finno-ugric.
Han is chinese.
His mother was not hungarian, she was german. From father's side he got 31% Ancient North Eurasian, 8% Iranian Neolithic, 5% Western Hunter gatherer, 3% Early Bronze Age and 2% Han. Probably father was 62% Ancient North Eurasian (finno-ugric-samoyedic), 16% Iranian Neolithic, 10% Western  Hunter Gatherer, 6% Early Bronze Age and 4% Han-Chinese.

Ancestry

References

Sources
 
 
 https://mandiner.hu/cikk/20210227_corvin_janos_matyas_kiraly_neparaczki_endre_arheogenetika

Other sources
   This work in turn cites:
 Schönherr, Gyula. Hunyadi Corvin János: 1473-1504. Budapest: Magyar Történelmi Társulat, 1894. (MEK) URL: Lásd külső hivatkozások 

Hungarian Roman Catholics
15th-century Hungarian nobility
Hunyadi family
Dukes of Slavonia
1473 births
1504 deaths
Bans of Croatia
Illegitimate children of Hungarian monarchs
1500s in Croatia
Pretenders to the Hungarian throne
Sons of kings